Sunil Chandrasekharan Oasis (born 3 April 1973 in Kozhikode, Kerala, India) is a retired Indian first class cricketer. He was a right-handed middle order batsman and a right arm medium bowler. He was captain of the Kerala cricket team. He also represented India at the Hong Kong Cricket Sixes in 2008.

External links
Cricinfo profile

References

1973 births
Living people
Kerala cricketers
Tamil Union Cricket and Athletic Club cricketers
South Zone cricketers
Indian cricketers
Cricketers from Kozhikode